HMS St Andrew was a 96-gun first-rate ship of the line of the Royal Navy, built by Christopher Pett at Woolwich Dockyard under the supervision of Christopher Pett until his death in March 1668, completed by Jonas Shish, and launched in 1670. Commanded by George Churchill, she took part in the 1692 victory over the French navy at Barfleur & La Hogue.

In 1703, she was renamed HMS Royal Anne, and rebuilt at Woolwich as a first rate of 100 guns. In 1707, she served as flagship of Vice-Admiral of the Blue Sir George Byng and belonged to Admiral Sir Cloudesley Shovell's fleet. She saw action during the unsuccessful Battle of Toulon and was present during the great naval disaster off the Isles of Scilly when Shovell and four of his ships (Association, Firebrand, Romney and Eagle) were lost, claiming the lives of nearly 2,000 sailors. Royal Anne suffered little to no damage and finally managed to reach Portsmouth.

The Royal Anne was broken up in 1727.

Notes

References

Lavery, Brian (2003) The Ship of the Line - Volume 1: The development of the battlefleet 1650–1850. Conway Maritime Press. .
Winfield, Rif (2009) British Warships in the Age of Sail 1603-1714: Design, Construction, Careers and Fates. Seaforth Publishing. .

Ships of the line of the Royal Navy
1670s ships
Ships built in Woolwich